The Archer School for Girls is an independent, college preparatory girls' school, grades 6–12, located in West Los Angeles, California, United States. Archer currently enrolls 490 students from 79 different zip codes and 141 feeder schools.

History
Archer was founded in 1995 by Megan Callaway, Victoria Shorr, and Diana Meehan, who are all graduates of girls' schools and parents of daughters about to enter middle school. According to Diana Meehan, the name Archer was chosen to signify a place where girls would be taught to be self-sufficient based on research specific to female learners. The school started in a converted Pacific Palisades dance studio with just over 30 sixth and seventh grade students.

In 1999 the school purchased the Eastern Star Home for Women in Brentwood Village, a building designed by California architect William Mooser. The building has been designated a Los Angeles Historic-Cultural Monument and is listed in the California and National Registers of Historic Places.

One of Archer's numerous traditions is the raising of a maypole each year in spring. The tradition began in 1981 when an anonymous donor arranged to have the maypole constructed for the residents of the Eastern Star Home for Women and then located at the site. Archer has continued this tradition, with 6th grade students performing a maypole dance on the last day of school.

In 2003, Archer received the LA Conservancy Preservation Award for Adaptive Reuse.

Academics
In addition to the traditional middle and high school subjects taught, Archer partners with the Online School for Girls to offer additional STEM, and language courses to students. In the 2018-2019 year, the School offered 149 courses.

Notable alumnae
 Gracie Abrams, singer-songwriter of "I Miss You, I'm Sorry" and "Brush Fire"
 Kate Berlant, American comedian from Sorry to Bother You and Once Upon a Time in Hollywood
 Molly Burch, American singer-songwriter 
 Carly Chaikin, American actress from Suburgatory and Mr. Robot
 Gia Coppola, American director of Palo Alto and Mainstream
 Emma Roberts, American actress from American Horror Story and Scream Queens
 Halston Sage, American actress from Paper Towns and the Orville
 Harley Quinn Smith, American actress from Yoga Hosers and Tusk

References

Further reading
 "Global Nomads Group Relies on Videoconferencing to Connect Students Worldwide", Annamaria DiGiorgio. T.H.E. Journal. Tustin: Feb. 2004. Vol.31, Iss. 7; pg. 8. PMID (ProQuest Media Identifier): 19693. Videoconferencing between Archer School, a school in New York, and a school in Israel during Global Perspective.
"Students capitalize on ingenuity in the face of dangers", Lily Richman. The Santa Monica Daily Press. Santa Monica: Dec 2018
"School News: A Student-Controlled Newspaper", National Association of Independent Schools. Fall 2018. The story of how Archer’s school newspaper club evolved into an award-winning student-run news site.
“The Hollywood Insider's Guide to L.A. Private Schools”, The Hollywood Reporter staff. Los Angeles: Aug. 2017. How Archer compares to other Los Angeles-area independent schools.

External links
 

Girls' schools in California
High schools in Los Angeles
Private high schools in California
Private middle schools in California
Brentwood, Los Angeles
1995 establishments in California
Educational institutions established in 1995
National Register of Historic Places in Los Angeles